Ruma kreivitär (Finnish: The Ugly Countess) is a 2002 historical novel by Finnish author Kaari Utrio telling a story of poor aristocrats and richening middle-class in the 1830s Finland.

Characters

Conrad Gyllenfalk, the last count of Bössa, an impoverished Earl
Julia Gyllenfalk, Conrad's eldest daughter, "The Ugly Countess"
Dorotea Gyllenfalk, Conrad's youngest daughter, a beauty
Anton Wendel, a tobacco manufacturer
Hanna Wendel, Anton's aunt
Filip Adelheim, a baron and official in the government
Eleonora, his wife the baroness
Augusta Adelheim, a beautiful, rich and noble lady in her twenties
Otto Adelheim, a young baron
Anders Granlund, a saddler master and prosperous burgher
Stina Granlund, Anders's wife
Carolina Lohm, a rich heiress from Stina's first marriage
Christina Tybelia, a dowager, wealthy, and relative to Julia's and Dorothea's late mother
Vladimir Tybelius, a yet more distant relation, Tybelia's step-grandson
The Honourable Thomas Stanley, a younger son of the Earl of Highminster from London
Karl Kynberg, a foreman in Wendel's tobacco factory
Orlando Vargas, a cigar master from North America (probably with Cuban roots)
Cecily Underhill Vargas, his wife, a dressmaker, from New England
Clas Johan von Numers, an elderly (retired) Captain
Wenzel Lorenz, an elderly (retired) Lieutenant of the Finnish Navy ekipaasi (equipage)

References

External links
 

Novels by Kaari Utrio
2002 novels
Novels set in the 1830s
Tammi (company) books
21st-century Finnish novels
Finnish historical novels